Chiloglanis pojeri is a species of upside-down catfish native to the Democratic Republic of the Congo where it occurs in the Lualaba River drainages and to Tanzania where it can be found in the Lake Tanganyika basin. This species grows to a length of  TL.

References

External links 

pojeri
Freshwater fish of Africa
Fish of the Democratic Republic of the Congo
Fish of Tanzania
Fish described in 1944